New York's 149th State Assembly district is one of the 150 districts in the New York State Assembly. It has been represented by Jonathan Rivera since 2021.

Geography
District 149 is in Erie County. It contains parts of the cities of Buffalo and Lackawanna, the town of Hamburg, including the villages of Blasdell and Hamburg, and the hamlet of Lake View.

Recent election results

2022

2020

2018

2016

2014

2012

References

149
 Erie County, New York